Dahira is a genus of moths in the family Sphingidae.

Species
Dahira bruno (Bryk, 1944)
Dahira falcata (Hayes, 1963)
Dahira hoenei (Mell, 1937)
Dahira jitkae Haxaire & Melichar, 2007
Dahira kitchingi (Brechlin, 2000)
Dahira klaudiae Brechlin, Melichar & Haxaire, 2006
Dahira marisae Schnitzler & Stüning, 2009
Dahira nili Brechlin, 2006
Dahira niphaphylla (Joicey & Kaye, 1917)
Dahira obliquifascia (Hampson, 1910)
Dahira pinratanai (Cadiou, 1991)
Dahira plutenkoi (Brechlin, 2002)
Dahira rebeccae (Hogenes & Treadaway, 1999)
Dahira rubiginosa Moore, 1888
Dahira svetsinjaevae Brechlin, 2006
Dahira taiwana (Brechlin, 1998)
Dahira tridens (Oberthür, 1904)
Dahira uljanae Brechlin & Melichar, 2006
Dahira viksinjaevi Brechlin, 2006
Dahira yunlongensis (Brechlin, 2000)
Dahira yunnanfuana (Clark, 1925)

 
Macroglossini
Moth genera
Taxa named by Frederic Moore